Zenarae Tshui Chu Antoine (née Pieters; born January 31, 1975) is an American college basketball coach who is the current head coach of the women's basketball team at Texas State University in San Marcos, Texas. 

Zenarae Antoine is in her twelfth season as the head coach at Texas State and is the winningest coach in program history. In her first season, she led one of the best turnarounds in school history, taking a 9-20 team the year before, to 17-14 including the school's first conference tournament win since 2003. She has also led the team appearances in the Women's Basketball Invitational (WBI) in 2014, 2015 and 2017 . Coach Antoine led the 2022-2023 Texas State Women's Basketball team to the Sun Belt regular season championship.

Early life and education 
Zenarae Antoine was born Zenarae Tshui Chu Pieters in Salina, Kansas and raised in Katy, Texas. Her father was an immigrant from British Guyana, and her mother is Chinese.

Antoine graduated from James E. Taylor High School in Katy. After high school, Antoine attended Colorado State University and played basketball for the Colorado State Rams from 1994 to 1998 while completing her degree in physical science with minors in geology and statistics. In 2000, Antoine received her master's degree in athletic administration at Ohio University; she also was a graduate assistant for Ohio Bobcats women's basketball in the 1999–2000 season.

Coaching career
In the 1998–99 season, Antoine was an AAU coach and semi-professional basketball player for the Southeast Ravens team in Houston.

Antoine's first full-time assistant position was in the 2000–01 season with the College of Charleston as Zenarae Pieters. Returning to Ohio University, Antoine was an assistant coach there from 2001 to 2003 going by Zena Pieters.

Now going by her married name, Antoine joined the staff of new head coach Tom Collen at Louisville as recruiting coordinator on June 24, 2003. As the lead recruiter, Antoine put together two nationally ranked recruiting classes in her last two seasons, no. 26 in 2006 and no. 25 in 2007. Antoine then followed Collen to Arkansas in 2007 and served four years under Collen as assistant coach.

Texas State (2011–present)
On April 18, 2011, Texas State hired Antoine as women's basketball head coach. Inheriting a team that went 9–20 in 2010–11, Antoine led Texas State to a 17–14 record in its final year in the Southland Conference. Texas State moved to the Western Athletic Conference for the 2012–13 season, during which the team went 10–20 yet won its first game against a Big 12 Conference opponent since 2005, 91–80 against TCU at home.

Beginning in the 2013–14 season, Texas State became a member of the Sun Belt Conference and made its first postseason appearance since 2008 in the WBI. Texas State made the WBI again in 2015 and 2017.

Head coaching record

Personal life
Since 2000, Zenarae Antoine has been married to football coach Ron Antoine, who is currently the Offensive Coordinator and teacher at Johnson High School in Buda, TX. They have three sons.

References 

1975 births
Living people
American sportspeople of Chinese descent
American sportspeople of Guyanese descent
American people of Malaysian descent
Sportspeople from Harris County, Texas
Texas State Bobcats women's basketball coaches
Colorado State Rams women's basketball players
Ohio University alumni
College of Charleston Cougars women's basketball coaches
Ohio Bobcats women's basketball coaches
Louisville Cardinals women's basketball coaches
Arkansas Razorbacks women's basketball coaches
Sportspeople from Salina, Kansas
People from Katy, Texas
Basketball players from Kansas
Basketball players from Texas